Garwara is a former constituency of the Uttar Pradesh Legislative Assembly in the Indian state of Uttar Pradesh.

Members of the Legislative Assembly

See also 
Jaunpur Assembly constituency

References 

Former assembly constituencies of Uttar Pradesh
Politics of Jaunpur district